The Atlantic Excellence was a trans-Atlantic airline alliance between Swissair, Delta Air Lines, Sabena and Austrian Airlines that was formed in 1997 and disbanded in 1999-2000. The dissolution of the code share agreement came soon after an announcement by Delta Air Lines that it was starting cooperative arrangements with Air France which led into the formation of the Skyteam alliance. SAirGroup had held negotiations with American Airlines about extending their cooperative arrangements, with both Swissair and Sabena intending to commence code-share services on North Atlantic routes with American Airlines which led into Qualiflyer.

In 1995 Swissair, Austrian Airlines and Delta Air Lines scheduled service began on a Vienna-Geneva-Washington DC routing on March 26 in a trilateral joint-venture operation. Swissair, Austrian Airlines, Sabena and Delta Air Lines were granted antitrust immunity by the US authorities, enabling them to collaborate more closely without violating that country's strict legislation on anti-competitive practices. In 1997 Austrian Airlines, Sabena, Delta Air Lines and Swissair launched "Atlantic Excellence", an extensive collaborative partnership with joint networks and operations between Europe and North America. Swissair and Sabena announced a transatlantic cooperation with American Airlines, in response to Delta Air Lines' decision (announced on the same day) to work more closely with Air France. Austrian Airlines then announced its intention to leave the Qualiflyer and join the Star Alliance. The CEOs of Swissair, Sabena, Austrian Airlines and Delta Air Lines decide to disband the Atlantic Excellence alliance on August 5, 2000. Swissair, Sabena and American Airlines announced the conclusion of a ten-year cooperation agreement, and applied to the US Department of Transportation for antitrust immunity (granted in May 2000). All services between Switzerland/Belgium and Boston, Chicago, Miami and Washington switched to codeshare operations starting on November 21.

Member airlines
Member airlines of Atlantic Excellence before the alliance's disbandment:

See also
 Oneworld
 Skyteam
 Star Alliance
 Qualiflyer
 Wings Alliance

Airline alliances
Delta Air Lines
Swissair